The Cecil B. DeMille Stakes is a Grade III American Thoroughbred horse race for two-year-olds over a distance of one mile on the turf track scheduled annually in November at Del Mar Racetrack in Del Mar, California. The event currently carries a purse of $100,000.

History

The event was inaugurated on 11 November 1982 as the Hoist The Flag Stakes at Hollywood Park Racetrack and was won by Fifth Division who was trained by A. Thomas Doyle and ridden by the US Hall of Fame jockey Laffit Pincay Jr. in a time of 1:35. The event was named in honor of Hoist The Flag, the 1970 US Champion Two-Year-Old Colt whose career was cut short due to injury as a three-year-old. Hoist The Flag was successful as a sire and as a broodmare sire, he was the leading juvenile sire in North America in 1981 and the leading broodmare sire in 1987.

In 1986 the event was classified as Grade III and in 1988 the event was upgraded to Grade II. However, the event that year was moved off the turf course and both divisions were held on the muddy dirt course. After one more running the event was downgraded back to Grade III in 1990.

In 1993 the event was renamed to the Generous Stakes after the Irish bred Generous who in a period of seven weeks in 1991 won the Epsom Derby by five lengths, the Irish Derby by three lengths and the King George VI and Queen Elizabeth Stakes by a record seven lengths. In 2005 the event was not held because the newly planted Hollywood Park's turf course had failed to root properly.   
 
The event has been run in split divisions six times, the last of which was in 2006. 

With the closure of Hollywood Park Racetrack in 2013 the event was renamed in 2014 to the Cecil B. DeMille Stakes and moved to Del Mar Racetrack. The movie producer Cecil B. DeMille and movie stars often frequented Del Mar Racetrack in the 1930s and ’40s. His grandson, Joseph Harper has been in a management position at Del Mar since 1978 and became CEO of the track in 1990.

Records

Speed record:
1 mile: 1:34.28 - The Leopard  (2007) 
 
Margins:
9 lengths – Incurable Optimist (1998)

Most wins by an owner:
 2 - Henry Pabst (1991, 1992)
 2 - Budget Stable (1997, 2015)
 2 - Gary Barber (2010, 2011)
 2 - Calumet Farm (2016, 2017)

Most wins by a jockey:
 5 - Chris McCarron (1983, 1984, 1987, 1996, 1997)

Most wins by a trainer:
 2 - Jerry M. Fanning (1983, 1984)
 2 - Melvin F. Stute (1985, 1988)
 2 - Ron McAnally (1989, 1996)
 2 - Kathy Walsh (1997, 2009)
 2 - Bob Baffert (2001, 2012)  
 2 - Todd A. Pletcher (2004, 2007)
 2 - John W. Sadler (2006, 2011)
 2 - Chad Brown (2017, 2021)

Winners

Legend:

 
 

Notes:

§ Ran as an entry

ƒ Filly or Mare

† Off turf

See also
List of American and Canadian Graded races

External links
 2020 Del Mar Media Guide

References

1982 establishments in California
Horse races in California
Del Mar Racetrack
Flat horse races for two-year-olds
Turf races in the United States
Graded stakes races in the United States
Recurring sporting events established in 1982
Grade 3 stakes races in the United States